The 2021–22 Third Amateur Football League season was the 72nd of the Bulgarian Third Amateur League. The group is equivalent to the third level of the Bulgarian football pyramid, comprising four divisions based on geographical areas. These divisions are the North-West, North-East, South-East, and South-West. The number of teams in each division varies, similarly to previous seasons.

Team Changes

Promoted to Second League
 Spartak Varna
 Levski Lom 
 Marek Dupnitsa
 Maritsa Plovdiv

Relegated to Regional Leagues 
 Benkovski Byala 
 Kubrat
 Tryavna 
 Perun Kresna
 Velbazhd Kyustendil
 Spartak Plovdiv
 Vereya

Promoted from Regional Leagues
 Pirin II
 OFK Kostinbrod
 Asenovets Asenovgrad
 Krumovgrad
 Lokomotiv II Plovdiv
 Beroe II
 Septemvri II Sofia
 Hebar II
 Spartak Varna II
 Lokomotiv Ruse
 Riltsi

Relegated from Second League
 Lokomotiv Gorna Oryahovitsa
 Vitosha

North-East Group

Stadia and Locations

League table

South-East Group

Stadia and Locations

League table

North-West Group

Stadia and locations

League table

South-West Group

Stadia and locations

League table

References

Third Amateur Football League (Bulgaria) seasons
3
Bulgaria